The 2014–15 Pro Tour season was the twentieth season of the Magic: The Gathering Pro Tour. It started on 9 August 2014 with Grand Prix Portland and Utrecht and ended on 2 August 2015 with the conclusion of Pro Tour Vancouver. The season consisted of 51 Grand Prix and four Pro Tours, located in Honolulu, Washington, D.C., Brussels, and Vancouver.

Mode 

Four Pro Tours and fifty-one Grands Prix were in the 2014–15 season. These are the events that award Pro Points, the points that were used to determine the Player of the Year Standings and Pro Club levels. Players were awarded Pro Levels for earning 20 (Silver level), 35 (Gold), and 46 points (Platinum), however only the six best Grand Prix results were counted towards seasonal point (the newly introduced "Grand Prix" invitation spot in Magic: The Gathering World Championship, however, will count every event in the season). Pro Club Levels came with certain benefits such as qualifications to subsequent Pro Tours, byes at Grand Prix, and airfare to Pro Tours. Based on the final standings of Pro Tours, Grand Prix, Worlds, and the World Magic Cup Pro Points were awarded as follows:

For competitors finishing outside the final elimination stage of Grand Prix and Pro Tours points are awarded depending on their score after the final Swiss round. 16 Swiss rounds are played at Pro Tours, 15 at individual Grand Prix, and 14 at Team Grand Prix. Pro Points are then awarded as follows.

Finally players that participated in the World Championship earned one Pro Point per win in the Swiss Portion and two Pro Points per win in the single elimination stage.

On 31 October 2014, Wizards of the Coast revised the pro point structure and retroactively applied the changes to all events in the current season. On 2 April 2015, they further revised the threshold of Pro Players Club level, lowering the threshold required for Platinum status from 48 to 46.

On 24 April 2014, ChannelFireball, the organizer of Grand Prix Las Vegas, announced the number of pre-registered players in that Grand Prix had exceeds the 5000 threshold, and the Grand Prix main event would be split into two independent Grand Prix main events sharing same venue. Making the total number of Grand Prix in this season to 52 instead of original 51.

Grand Prix 

GP Portland (9–10 August 2014)
Format: Team Limited
Attendance: 1947 (649 teams)
1.
 Reid Duke
 Owen Turtenwald
 William Jensen
2.
 Eric Severson
 Benjamin Weitz
 Josiah Skallerup
3. 
 Matt Katz
 Ben Yu
 Jameson Painter
4
 Eric Froehlich
 Luis Scott-Vargas
 Paul Cheon

GP Utrecht (9–10 August 2014)
Format: Standard
Attendance: 1518
 Oliver Polak-Rottmann
 Eliott Boussaud
 Richard Webels
 Susanne Bornelöv
 Ciprian Catană
 Alex Stok
 Armel Primot
 Christoffer Enggaard Larsen

GP Kobe (23–24 August 2014)
Format: Modern
Attendance: 2299
 Teruya Kakumae
 Yuusei Gotou
 Shohei Mita
 Yuuki Akaboshi
 Ken Sawada
 Bo Sun
 Yuuki Ichikawa
 Takuya Yamada

GP Sydney (23–24 August 2014)
Format: Limited
Attendance: 813
 Paul Jackson
 James Zhang
 Matthew Griffin
 Maitland Cameron
 Chris Sparks
 Tomoharu Saito
 Park Jun Young
 Don van Ravenzwaaij

GP Shanghai (4–5 October 2014)
Format: Limited
Attendance: 1287
 Yu Yin
 Xu Su
 Tamada Ryoichi
 Han Bing
 Zhang Meng Qiu
 Liu Yuchen
 Oh Joo-hyun
 Shuhei Nakamura

GP Salt Lake City (6–7 September 2014)
Format: Limited
Attendance: 878
 Brandon Nelson
 Sammy Batarseh
 Chris Woodall
 Eric Froehlich
 Paul Rietzl
 Jamie Parke
 Nathan Holiday
 Shady Badran

GP Orlando (4–5 October 2014)
Format: Limited
Attendance: 2277
 Eugene Hwang
 Melissa DeTora
 Sol Malka
 Artur Villela
 Pierre Mondon
 Harry Corvese
 Ian Farnung
 Frank Lepore

Pro Tour Khans of Tarkir 
Honolulu (10–12 October 2014)
 Prize pool: $250,000
 Format: Standard, Booster Draft (Khans of Tarkir-Khans of Tarkir-Khans of Tarkir)
 Attendance: 357

Top 8

Final standings

Pro Player of the year standings

Grand Prix 

GP Los Angeles (18–19 October 2014)
Format: Standard
Attendance: 1766
 Daniel Scheid
 Denis Ulanov
 Eric Pei
 Carlo Falcis
 Ryoichi Tamada
 Brad Nelson
 Isaac Sears
 Christopher Goldsmith

GP Stockholm (25–26 October 2014)
Format: Standard
Attendance: 1043
 Matej Zatlkaj
 Einar Baldvinsson
 Thiago Rodrigues
 Lukas Blohon
 Giovanni Rosi
 Matteo Cirigliano
 Christian Seibold
 Alexander Pasgaard

GP Nashville (1–2 November 2014)
Format: Team Limited
Attendance: 1392 (464 teams)
1.
 Matt Nass
 Jacob Wilson
 Jesse Hampton
2.
 Tom Martell
 Paulo Vitor Damo da Rosa
 Shahar Shenhar
3.
 David Sharfman
 Orrin Beasley
 Pat Cox
4.
 Sam Black
 Matt Severa
 Gaudenis Vidugiris

GP Santiago (1–2 November 2014)
Format: Standard
Attendance: 660
 Eduardo dos Santos Vieira
 Rodrigo Soto
 Nicolas de Nicola
 Daniel Gaete Quezada
 Willy Edel
 Pedro Carvalho
 Fernando Barros
 David Sologuren

GP Ottawa (22–23 November 2014)
Format: Limited
Attendance: 1353
 Seth Manfield
 Neal Oliver
 Lucas Siow
 Xavier Allegrucci
 Shahar Shenhar
 Sam Black
 Pascal Maynard
 Jessica Buchanan

GP Madrid (15–16 November 2014)
Format: Modern
Attendance: 1900
 Immanuel Gerschenson
 Till Riffert
 Ricardo van den Bogaard
 Jose Rodriguez Pozo
 Marcio Carvalho
 Kevin Grove
 Andrew Devine
 Steffen van de Veen

GP Strasbourg (29–30 November 2014)
Format: Limited
Attendance: 1996
 Tamás Nagy
 Pierre Dagen
 Martin Jůza
 Kentarou Yamamoto
 Oleg Plisov
 Max Pritsch
 Daan Pruijt
 Kees Van Montfoort

GP New Jersey (15–16 November 2014)
Format: Legacy
Attendance: 4003
 Brian Braun-Duin
 Tom Ross
 Royce Walter
 Philipp Schonegger
 Phillip Braverman
 Daniel Jordan
 Joseph Santomassino
 Lam Phan

GP San Antonio (29–30 November 2014)
Format: Standard
Attendance: 1182
 Ryan Scullin
 Orry Swift
 Jeremy Frye
 Albert Ake
 Angel Solache
 Larry Li
 Randall Gay
 Gareth Aye

Magic: The Gathering World Championship 
Nice (2–7 December 2014)
 Prize pool: $150,000
 Format: Vintage Masters Booster Draft, Standard, Khans of Tarkir Booster Draft, Modern
Vintage Masters "packs" will be generated by Magic Online exclusively for event's use.
 Attendance: 24

Top 4 playoff

Final standings 

The following twenty-four players received an invitation to the 2014 World Championship due to their performance in the 2013–14 season. They are ordered according to the final standings of the event.

World Magic Cup 
Nice (5–7 December 2014)
 Prize pool: $250,000 
 Format: Team Constructed, Team Limited
 Attendance: 72 teams

Top 8

Final standings

Pro Player of the year standings

Grand Prix 

GP Baltimore (13–14 December 2014)
Format: Limited
Attendance: 1235
 Gerard Fabiano
 David Foster
 Harry Bradford
 Ben Stark
 Chris Fennell
 Craig Wescoe
 Timothy Wu
 Josh Utter-Leyton

GP Manila (3–4 January 2015)
Format: Standard
Attendance:1410
 Joseph Sclauzero
 Kuo Tzu-Ching
 Lee Shi Tian
 Makihito Mihara
 Won Dae-hoon
 Christian Calcano
 Martin Jůza
 Arnulfo Taghoy, Jr.

GP Mexico City (31 January–1 February 2015)
Format: Limited
Attendance: 641
 Pascal Maynard
 Mario Flores
 Chapman Sim
 Andreas Canavati
 Axel Martinez
 Juan Carlos Botis
 Martin Jůza
 Eduardo dos Santos Viera

GP Milan (13–14 December 2014)
Format: Modern
Attendance: 1760
 Magnus Lantto
 Niccolo Belini
 Piotr Glogowski
 Louis Deltour
 Miguel Gatica
 Eduardo Sajgalik
 Lucantonio Salvidio
 Dario Parazzoli

GP Omaha (10–11 January 2015)
Format: Modern
Attendance: 1168
 Erik Peter
 Stephen Speck
 Pascal Maynard
 Jonathan Paton
 Zac Roorda
 Scott Lipp
 Andrew Elenbogen
 Stephen Berrios

GP San Jose (31 January–1 February 2015)
Format:  Team Limited
Attendance: 1968 (656 teams)
1.
 Eric Froehlich
 Luis Scott-Vargas
 Paul Cheon
2.
 Matthew Sperling
 David Williams
 Paul Rietzl
3.
 Ari Lax
 Chris Fennell
 Craig Wescoe
4.
 Robert Smith
 Sean Gifford
 Tyler Blum

GP Denver (3–4 January 2015)
Format: Standard
Attendance: 1536
 Andrew Brown
 Matthew Sperling
 Sam Pardee
 Valentin Mackl
 Edward Nguyen
 William Jensen
 Paul Cheon
 Lukas Parsons

GP Shizuoka (10–11 January 2015)
Format: Limited
Attendance: 2236
 Akito Shinoda
 Bo Sun
 Chihiro Kawada
 Yuuki Ichikawa
 Yuki Matsumoto
 Satoshi Yamaguchi
 Junichi Yabuta
 Shinji Nakano

Pro Tour Fate Reforged 
Washington, D.C. (6–8 February 2015)
 Prize pool: $250,000
 Format: Modern, Booster Draft
 Attendance: 407

Top 8

Final standings

Pro Player of the year standings

Grand Prix 

GP Seville (14–15 February 2015)
Format: Standard
Attendance: 799
 Immanuel Gerschenson
 Pierre Sommen
 Carlos Ballester Garcia
 Nicholas Merrien
 Martin Jůza
 Marcio Carvalho
 Marcos Cordero Valle
 Alexandre Habert

GP Liverpool (7–8 March 2015)
Format: Limited
Attendance: 1797
 Martin Dang
 Nikolas Labahn
 Lukas Blohon
 Marcio Carvalho
 Andreas Jonsson
 Kenneth Ellingsen
 Daniel Oppliger
 Timothée Simonot

GP Cleveland (14–15 March 2015)
Format: Limited
Attendance: 1771
 Bill Tsang
 Jake Mondello
 Gerard Fabiano
 Andrew Cuneo
 Eric Blanchet
 Christian Calcano
 Yuuya Watanabe
 Ross Merriam

GP Memphis (21–22 February 2015)
Format: Standard
Attendance: 1075
 Jack Fogle
 Ben Stark
 Brad Nelson
 Steve Rubin
 Patrick Crowe
 Chris Fennel
 Alex Majlaton
 Eric Rath

GP Miami (7–8 March 2015)
Format: Standard
Attendance: 1380
 Daniel Cecchetti
 Corey Baumeister
 Chad Kastel
 Ralph Betesh
 Ryan Grodzinski
 Brian Lee
 Andy Boswell
 Zan Syed

GP Vancouver (21–22 February 2015)
Format: Modern
Attendance: 1116
 Dan Lanthier
 Robbie Schmidt
 Florian Koch
 Alexander Hayne
 Tom Martell
 Stephen Speck
 Jesse Moulton
 Daniel Ward

GP Auckland (14–15 March 2015)
Format: Limited
Attendance: 383
 Teruya Kakumae
 Maitland Cameron
 Fabian Dickmann
 John Brugman
 Dylan Goldsmith
 Jacques van Eeden
 Yifan Wei
 Jason Chung

Pro Tour Dragons of Tarkir 
Brussels (10–12 April 2015)
 Prize pool: $250,000
 Format: Standard, Booster Draft
Attendance: 407

Top 8

Final standings

Pro Player of the year standings

Grand Prix 

GP Kraków (18–19 April 2015)
Format: Standard
Attendance: 1149
 Alexander Hayne
 Robin Dolar
 Paulo Vitor Damo da Rosa
 Bartłomiej Lewandowski
 Martin Müller
 Alex Hottmann
 Leo Schulhof
 Samuel Pardee

GP Toronto (2–3 May 2015)
Format: Standard
Attendance: 1613
 Lucas Siow
 Edgar Magalhaes
 Mark Jacobson
 Brad Nelson
 Ben Feingersh
 Benjamin Weitz
 Dan Fournier
 Craig Wescoe

GP Florence (16–17 May 2015)
Format: Team Limited
Attendance: 1296 (432 teams)
1.
 Frank Schäfer
 Rosario Maij
 Adrian Rosada
2.
 Jasper Grimmer
 Robin Steinborn
 Amit Cohen
3. 
 Dan Gardener
 Marco Orsini-Jones
 Matteo Orsini-Jones
4.
 Daniel Royde
 Eduardo Sajgalik
 Fabrizio Anteri

GP Kyoto (18–19 April 2015)
Format: Legacy
Attendance: 2027
 Yuuta Takahashi
 Kazuya Murakami
 Kenta Harane
 Kai Thiele
 Yukihiro Satake
 Yousuke Morinaga
 Shouta Yasooka
 Kei Umehara

GP Atlantic City (9–10 May 2015)
Format: Limited
Attendance: 1655
 Christian Calcano
 Alexander Hayne
 Jacob Wilson
 Bryan Gottlieb
 Stephen Neal
 Luis Scott-Vargas
 Gaudenis Vidugiris
 Zachary Jesse

GP Shanghai (16–17 May 2015)
Format: Standard
Attendance: 964
 Yuuki Ichikawa
 Devsharan Singh
 Nam Sung-wook
 Hu Jin
 Xie Hao Chen
 Yang Dehua
 Lin Yang
 Bo Li

GP São Paulo (2–3 May 2015)
Format: Standard
Attendance: 1390 
 Paulo Vitor Damo da Rosa
 Maximiliano Sanchez Pinnilo
 Sergio Barrientos Ochoa
 Mateus Batista de Melo
 Claudio Barriento Ochoa
 Leonardo Oliveria Graichen
 Mariano Cartechino
 Ricardo Nunes Martins

GP Paris (9–10 May 2015)
Format: Standard
Attendance: 1426
 Amand Dosimont
 Zan Syed
 Antonio Del Moral Leon
 Kim Kyoung-soo
 Tristan Pölzl
 Christian Hauck
 Jasper Grimmer
 Hugo Diniz

GP Las Vegas 1 (30–31 May 2015)
Format: Limited
Attendance: 3687
 Aaron Lewis
 Lucas Duchow
 Pascal Maynard
 David Jetha
 Ben Stark
 Andrew Lozano
 Peter Maginnis
 Marcel Dizon

GP Las Vegas 2 (30–31 May 2015)
Format: Limited
Attendance: 3864
 Scott Markeson
 David Heineman
 Simon Kim
 Danny Goldstein
 Pedro Carvalho
 Shaun McLaren
 Eugen Koo
 Brian Richards

GP Charlotte (13–14 June 2015)
Format: Modern
Attendance: 2870
 Michael Malone
 Wesley See
 Andrew Wagoner
 Darien Elderfield
 Zachary Jesse
 Ian Bosley
 Samuel Pardee
 Donald Smith

GP Singapore (27–28 June 2015)
Format: Modern
Attendance: 1130
 Hitomi Masaki
 Steven Tan
 Keita Kawasaki
 Reid Duke
 Wei Song Ray Wee
 Yuuta Takahashi
 Tay Jun Hao
 Zhijian Yang

GP Lille (4–5 July 2015)
Format: Legacy
Attendance: 1548
 Claudio Bonanni
 Olivier Ruel
 Ricardo Sánchez
 Christoph Alsheimer
 Thomas Van der Paelt
 Petr Sochůrek
 Alex Mortimer
 Jaroslav Bouček

GP Utrecht (30–31 May 2015)
Format: Limited
Attendance: 3613
 Davide Vergoni
 Lars Rosengren
 Iwan Smit
 Christian Seibold
 Branco Neirynck
 Christian Åhlström
 Fabian Dickmann
 David Joachim

GP Providence (20–21 June 2015)
Format: Standard
Attendance: 1053
 Sky Mason
 Neal Sacks
 Eric Severson
 Pedro Carvalho
 Steve Rubin
 Raeef Istfan
 Oliver Tiu
 Josh McClain

GP Buenos Aires (27–28 June 2015)
Format: Standard
Attendance: 705
 Pascal Maynard
 Marcos Paulo de Jesus Freitas
 Fabio Ancelmo
 Thales Santos Navarro
 Nicolas De Nicola
 Renzo Chiappa
 Rodrigo Soto Sanchez
 Facundo Conde

GP Dallas (25–26 July 2015)
Format: Limited
Attendance: 1671
 Shuhei Nakamura
 Ross Merriam
 Dan Jordan
 Nathaniel Smith
 Aryeh Wiznitzer
 Joel Larsson
 Greg Orange
 David Ochoa

GP Chiba (30–31 May 2015)
Format: Limited
Attendance: 3551
 Yuki Matsumoto
 Junya Iyanaga
 Shougo Sunada
 Katsuhiro Mori
 Ichiro Matsubara
 Kim Minsu
 Albert Budisanjaya
 Ryouta Shimizu

GP Copenhagen (20–21 June 2015)
Format: Modern
Attendance: 1337
 Przemek Knocinski
 Steve Hatto
 Marcio Carvalho
 Christoffer Larsen
 Thiago Rodrigues
 Arnaud Hocquemiller
 Branco Neirynck
 Hans Christian Ljungquist

GP Montreal (4–5 July 2015)
Format: Limited
Attendance: 1220
 Mike Sigrist
 David Goldfarb
 Martin-Eric Gauthier
 Jelger Wiegersma
 Adam Waksman
 Reid Duke
 Gautier Cousin
 Stephen Whelan

Pro Tour Magic Origins 
Vancouver (31 July–2 August 2015)
 Prize pool: $250,000
 Format: Standard, Booster Draft
 Attendance: 391

Top 8

Final standings

Pro Player of the Year final standings 
The 2014–15 Pro Tour season ended after Pro Tour Magic Origins. These are the final standings of the Player of the Year race, including every player who at the end of the season reached Platinum, the highest Pro Club Level.

Invitees to the 2015 World Championship 

The following twenty-four players received an invitation to the 2015 World Championship due to their performance in the 2014–15 season.

References 

Magic: The Gathering professional events